Neupré is a wallonian municipality of Belgium located in the province of Liège. 

On January 1, 2006, Neupré had a total population of 9,798. The total area is 31.69 km² which gives a population density of 309 inhabitants per km².

The municipality consists of the following districts: Éhein, Neuville-en-Condroz, Plainevaux, and Rotheux-Rimière. The name of Neupré is coined on the first letters of the districts : NEUville, Plainevaux, Rotheux and Éhein. 

On the southeast edge of Neupré lies the Ardennes American Cemetery and Memorial, the resting place of over 5,000 American soldiers who died in Northern Europe during World War II.

Politics and administration

List of mayors 
 1977-1982 : Pierre Maystadt (Neupré Uni)
 1983-1992 : Pol Aimont (PRL)
 1992-1994 : Jean-Pascal D'Inverno (PSC-Intérêts communaux)
 1995-2000 : Josée Pagnoul-Demet (PS)
 2001-2017 : Arthur Cortis (PS)
 Since the 16/6/2017 : Virginie Defrang-Firket (MR)

Municipal council

See also
 List of protected heritage sites in Neupré

References

External links
 
 

Municipalities of Liège Province
Segni (tribe)